Sir Harold William Young KCMG (30 June 1923 – 21 November 2006) was an Australian Liberal Party politician who represented South Australia in the Senate from 1968 to 1983, acting as President of the Senate from 1981 to 1983.

Early life
Harold Young was born in Port Broughton, South Australia on 30 June 1923 and educated at Prince Alfred College in Adelaide. Prior to entering Parliament, he was a wheat farmer and grazier and was involved with various industry bodies, including acting as vice-president of the South Australian division of the Farmers and Graziers Association.

Politics
Young was elected to represent South Australia in the 1967 Senate election, his term as Senator commencing on 1 July 1968, and re-elected in 1974, 1975 and 1977.

From 18 August 1981 Young served as President of the Senate. He lost his own seat in the 1983 double dissolution election, the first sitting Australian Senate President to suffer this fate.

Personal life
He was appointed a Knight Commander of the Order of St Michael and St George (KCMG) in the New Year's Day Honours of 1983, "for services to the Parliament of Australia".

Sir Harold died on 21 November 2006 and his funeral was held in Norwood on 27 November. He was survived by his wife Lady (Margaret) Young and their four children, Sue, Scott, Andrea and Rob.

References

External links
 Senate Hansard, 27 November 2006, pp. 43–47, 129–130, Condolence Motion on the death of Sir Harold Young
 

1923 births
2006 deaths
Presidents of the Australian Senate
Members of the Australian Senate
Members of the Australian Senate for South Australia
Australian Knights Commander of the Order of St Michael and St George
Australian politicians awarded knighthoods
Royal Australian Navy sailors
Royal Australian Navy personnel of World War II
People educated at Prince Alfred College
Liberal Party of Australia members of the Parliament of Australia
20th-century Australian politicians
Australian farmers